The Lăpugiu is a right tributary of the river Valea Mare in Romania. It flows into the Valea Mare in Lăpugiu de Jos.

References

Rivers of Romania
Rivers of Hunedoara County